Chetone is a genus of tiger moths in the family Erebidae. The genus was erected by Jean Baptiste Boisduval in 1870.

Species

 Chetone angulosa Walker, 1854
 Chetone catilina Cramer, 1775
 Chetone conjuncta Hering, 1925
 Chetone decisa Walker, 1854
 Chetone felderi Boisduval, 1870
 Chetone histrio Boisduval, 1870
 Chetone histriomorpha Hering, 1925
 Chetone hydra Butler, 1871
 Chetone isse Hübner, 1831
 Chetone ithomia Boisduval, 1870
 Chetone ithrana Butler, 1871
 Chetone kenara Butler, 1871
 Chetone malankiatae Strand, 1921
 Chetone meta Druce, 1895
 Chetone mimica Butler, 1874
 Chetone phaeba Boisduval, 1870
 Chetone phyleis Druce, 1885
 Chetone salvini Boisduval, 1870
 Chetone studyi Hering, 1925
 Chetone suprema Hering, 1925
 Chetone variifasciata Hering, 1930
 Chetone zuleika Becker & Goodger, 2013

References

External links

 
Pericopina
Moth genera